The 2019 Idaho State Bengals football team represented Idaho State University as a member of the Big Sky Conference during the 2019 NCAA Division I FCS football season. Led by third-year head coach Rob Phenicie, the Bengals compiled an overall record of 3–9 with a mark of 2–6 in conference play, placing in a five-way tie for ninth in the Big Sky. Idaho State played their home games at Holt Arena in Pocatello, Idaho.

Previous season
The Bengals finished the 2018 season 6–5, 5–3 in Big Sky play to finish in a tie for fourth place.

Preseason

Big Sky preseason poll
The Big Sky released their preseason media and coaches' polls on July 15, 2019. The Bengals were picked to finish in seventh place in both polls.

Preseason All–Big Sky team
The Bengals had three players selected to the preseason all-Big Sky team.

Offense

Mitch Gueller – WR

Defense

Kody Graves – ILB

Adkin Agguirre – S

Schedule

Game summaries

Western State

at Utah

at Northern Iowa

Portland State

at Montana

North Dakota

at Idaho

at Southern Utah

Northern Colorado

Eastern Washington

at BYU

at Weber State

Ranking movements

References

Idaho State
Idaho State Bengals football seasons
Idaho State Bengals football